Hedotettix grossivalva is an insect found in China, belonging to the Tetrigidae family.

See also
Hedotettix brachynota
Hedotettix xueshanensis

References

Insects of China
Insects described in 2006
Tetrigidae